Teh Botol is an Indonesian drink produced by the company Sosro and is sold worldwide. Teh Botol literally means bottled tea in Indonesian. It is a sweetened jasmine tea and it is usually served cold. In addition, Sosro also sells the tea in a signature glass bottle as well as Tetra Pak and plastic bottle packaging.

History 
The Sosro brand, a well-known tea brand in Indonesia, is taken from the Sosrodjojo (Souw Seng Kiam) family name, the owners of the company. They started the business of marketing jasmine tea based in Slawi, a small town in Central Java province, in 1940. The first brand was called Teh Cap Botol ("bottle brand tea").

In 1965 the Cap Botol jasmine tea was first introduced to Jakarta by promoting the product with free samples under the marketing name of cicip rasa. During the free tasting promotion, the jasmine tea was brewed on the spot, but the time required for brewing was too long for some of their more impatient customers. To overcome this problem, the promotion staff brewed the tea in the office before going to the promotion location and poured the ready-to-consume jasmine tea into big pots and pans. However, this technique did not solve the problem; the tea in large pots and pans spilled over on the way before they reached the location. Another solution was found by placing the brewed jasmine tea in clean used glass bottles, which were normally used for packing soda, soy sauce and other products. It was successful and gave birth of the teh botol (or bottled tea) brand name in 1969. The official name was Teh Botol Sosro.

The first bottles were introduced in 1970. In 1972, they redesigned the bottles. In 1974, with the establishment of PT, Sinar Sosro (a company producing the Teh Botol Sosro) in Ujung Menteng (part of Bekasi at that time) again redesigned the bottle which remains in use today.

See also 

 Camellia sinensis
 Cuisine of Indonesia
 List of Indonesian beverages
 Tea

References

External links 
 Local preference for tea puts Coca-Cola in cold sweat - The Jakarta Post 03 Sep 2005

Indonesian drinks
Tea brands
Indonesian brands
Drink companies of Indonesia
Iced tea brands